Sugar Creek Township is one of nine townships in Hancock County, Indiana, United States. As of the 2010 census, its population was 14,920 and it contained 5,876 housing units.

History
Sugar Creek Township was organized in 1828, and named from its principal stream.

Rufus and Amanda Black House was listed on the National Register of Historic Places in 2014.

Geography
Lakes in this township include Spring Lake. The streams of Palestine Branch and Sugar Run run through this township.

Cities and towns
 Cumberland (southeast quarter)
 Spring Lake
 New Palestine

Unincorporated towns
 Carriage Estates
 Gem
 Philadelphia
 Schildmeier Park
(This list is based on USGS data and may include former settlements.)

Adjacent townships
 Buck Creek Township (north)
 Center Township (northeast)
 Brandywine Township (east)
 Van Buren Township, Shelby County (southeast)
 Moral Township, Shelby County (south)
 Franklin Township, Marion County (southwest)
 Warren Township, Marion County (west)

Cemeteries
The township contains nine cemeteries: Dye, Langenberger, McNamee, New Palestine, Owen, Pitcher, Richmond, Schramm, and Zion Lutheran.

Major highways
  U.S. Route 40
  U.S. Route 52

References
 U.S. Board on Geographic Names (GNIS)
 United States Census Bureau cartographic boundary files

External links
 Indiana Township Association
 United Township Association of Indiana
 Sugar Creek Township, Hancock County, Indiana

Townships in Hancock County, Indiana
Townships in Indiana